Homebody (1998) is a horror novel by American writer Orson Scott Card. It takes place in modern-day America.

Plot introduction
Homebody is the story of Don Lark who moves into an old house and is forced to deal with the supernatural forces that live in it.

Influences
As many of Card's other literature, a Christian/Mormon influence is present in this book.

See also

 List of works by Orson Scott Card
 Orson Scott Card

References

External links

 About the novel Homebody from Card's website

1998 American novels
1998 fantasy novels
Novels by Orson Scott Card
American horror novels
HarperCollins books